Ophthalmoptera longipennis is a species of ulidiid or picture-winged fly in the genus Ophthalmoptera of the family Ulidiidae.

References

Ulidiidae